Nicolas Görtler (born 8 March 1990) is a German footballer who plays as a forward.

Career
Görtler began his career with Eintracht Bamberg, making 19 appearances in the 2009–10 season as the club were relegated from the Regionalliga Süd. He scored 17 goals in the first half of the following season in the Bayernliga before returning to the Regionalliga Süd in January 2011 to sign for 1. FC Nürnberg II. 18 months later he signed for SV Wehen Wiesbaden of the 3. Liga, making his debut as a substitute for Lars Guenther in a 3–2 defeat against Chemnitzer FC. He returned to Eintracht Bamberg in July 2013 and scored 21 goals in his first season back with the club to finish as top scorer of the Regionalliga Bayern.

External links
 
 

1990 births
Living people
Association football forwards
German footballers
Eintracht Bamberg players
1. FC Nürnberg II players
SV Wehen Wiesbaden players
1. FC Schweinfurt 05 players
3. Liga players
Regionalliga players
Sportspeople from Bamberg
Footballers from Bavaria